Quathlambia is a genus of crane flies in the family Limoniidae.

Distribution
South Africa.

Species
Q. stuckenbergi Alexander, 1956

References

Limoniidae
Tipulomorpha genera
Diptera of Africa